Loves Music, Loves to Dance is a novel by Mary Higgins Clark. It was one of Publishers Weekly's top 10 bestselling novels of 1991. The novel was adapted into a film in 2001.

Adaptation 
Loves Music, Loves to Dance was adapted into a TV movie which premiered on Pax TV (now Ion) in 2001. It stars Patsy Kensit, Cynthia Preston, Dean McDermot and Louis Ferreira.

References

1991 American novels
Novels by Mary Higgins Clark
American novels adapted into films
American novels adapted into television shows
Simon & Schuster books